Vincent Anthony Guaraldi (né Dellaglio, July 17, 1928 – February 6, 1976) was an American jazz pianist best known for composing music for animated television adaptations of the Peanuts comic strip. His compositions for this series included their signature melody "Linus and Lucy" and the holiday standard "Christmas Time Is Here". He is also known for his performances on piano as a member of Cal Tjader's 1950s ensembles and for his own solo career. His 1962 composition "Cast Your Fate to the Wind" became a radio hit and won a Grammy Award in 1963 for Best Original Jazz Composition. He died of a sudden heart attack in February 1976 at age 47, moments after concluding a nightclub performance in Menlo Park, California.

Early career
Guaraldi was born in San Francisco's North Beach area, a place that became very important to his blossoming musical career. His last name changed to "Guaraldi" after his mother, Carmela (née Marcellino; 1908–1999), divorced his biological father (whose last name was Dellaglio) and married Tony Guaraldi, who adopted the boy. Growing up, Guaraldi was influenced by both of his maternal uncles, Joe and Maurice "Muzzy" Marcellino, both of whom headed jazz big bands in San Francisco for many years. He graduated from Lincoln High School, briefly attended San Francisco State College, and served in the United States Army as a cook in Korea from 1946 to 1948.

Guaraldi's first recording was an unreleased demo made with Tom Hart in mid-1951. His first official recording was made in November 1951 with Cal Tjader's Mambo Trio. The songs—"Chopsticks Mambo", "Vibra-Tharpe", "Three Little Words" and "Lullaby of the Leaves"—were released in December 1953 on the 10-inch LP record, The Cal Tjader Trio. By summer 1954, Guaraldi had formed his first trio, with Eddie Duran (guitar) and Dean Reilly (double bass), and regularly performing in the house band at the hungry i jazz club in San Francisco, backing the singer Faith Winthrop.

Guaraldi's first recorded debut as a group leader occurred in August 1955 during a live session held at the Black Hawk. Of the tracks recorded, two of them ("Ginza" and "Calling Dr. Funk" the former recorded as part of the Ron Crotty Trio) were original compositions. The sessions were eventually released by Fantasy Records in March 1956 on Modern Music from San Francisco. Fantasy was impressed enough with Guaraldi to offer him an exclusive contract in April 1956, yielding his debut album, Vince Guaraldi Trio, which featured Duran and Reilly sans drummer. At the time, Guaraldi was subsequently appearing with Woody Herman's Third Herd, delivering energetic performances on a regular basis−a sharp contrast from the quiet recordings featured on his debut release.

Guaraldi then reunited with Tjader in August 1956 and was an integral part of two bands that the vibraphonist assembled. The first band played mainly straight jazz and included Al Torre (drums), Eugene Wright (bass) and Luis Kant (congas and bongos). The second band was formed in the spring of 1958 and included Al McKibbon (bass), Mongo Santamaría (congas and bongos) and Willie Bobo (drums and timbales). Reed men Paul Horn and Jose "Chombo" Silva were also added to the group for certain live performances and recordings.

Guaraldi recorded his follow-up album, A Flower Is a Lovesome Thing in April 1957, again featuring Duran and Reilly and again without a drummer. The album, released in October 1957, did not perform well, and Fantasy did not retain Guaraldi.

Mainstream success
Guaraldi left the group early in 1959 to pursue his own projects full-time. He might have remained a well-respected but minor jazz figure had he not written an original number to fill out his covers of Antonio Carlos Jobim/Luiz Bonfá tunes on his 1962 album, Jazz Impressions of Black Orpheus, inspired by the French/Brazilian film Black Orpheus. Fantasy Records released "Samba de Orpheus" as a single, trying to catch the building bossa nova wave, but it was destined to sink without a trace when radio DJs began turning it over and playing the B-side, Guaraldi's "Cast Your Fate to the Wind". A gentle, likeable tune, it stood out from everything else on the airwaves and became a hit, spending 19 weeks on the Top 100 chart and peaking at No. 22—an unusual feat for a jazz instrumental. Guaraldi ultimately won a Grammy for Best Original Jazz Composition. Guaraldi never minded taking requests to play it when he appeared live. "It's like signing the back of a check", he once remarked. When asked by San Francisco Chronicle jazz critic Ralph J. Gleason if he felt like he sold out with the song, Guaraldi responded, "I feel I bought in." Guaraldi later commented, "I don't think I'm a great piano player, but I would like to have people like me, to play pretty tunes and reach the audience. And I hope some of those tunes will become standards. I want to write standards, not just hits."

Fantasy quickly capitalized on Guaraldi's unexpected success by releasing In Person, a live album recorded at the Trident in Sausalito, California in December 1962. Guaraldi then recorded an album called Vince Guaraldi, Bola Sete and Friends with guitarist Bola Sete, Fred Marshall (bass) and Jerry Granelli (drums). This began a period of collaboration between Guaraldi and Sete where Guaraldi began experimenting with bossa nova-influenced music as well as with the electric piano. An appearance on Ralph Gleason's television series Jazz Casual drew greater attention to the Guaraldi/Sete collaboration (the episode was posthumously released on CD in 2001), followed by the January 1965 release of From All Sides. A live performance recorded at the El Matador jazz club in Spring 1965 was released in October 1966 on Live at El Matador (Guaraldi's final release on Fantasy).

Guaraldi decided to experiment with combining Latin jazz and orchestral instrumentation on his next release, The Latin Side of Vince Guaraldi (1964). For the album's orchestrations, Guaraldi turned to Jack Weeks, son of bandleader Anson Weeks, who had previously worked with Guaraldi peers Cal Tjader and Dave Brubeck. This experimentation may have led to the loss of Fred Marshall, who left the group in 1964 citing "personal differences" after Guaraldi purportedly threw a cup of coffee at Marshall during the 17th Berkeley Jazz Festival.Shortly after this time, Guaraldi was invited to compose a "jazz mass" with the Eucharist chorus of San Francisco's Grace Cathedral. Utilizing his Latin influences from his bossa nova days with Sete, Guaraldi composed a number of pieces with waltz tempos and jazz standards. The performance was recorded on May 21, 1965, and released that September as At Grace Cathedral.

Guaraldi's relationship with Fantasy Records began to sour by 1965 after it was learned he was receiving only five percent of every record sale while Fantasy retained the remaining 95 percent. He sued in early 1966 in an effort to sever all relationships with the label; Fantasy promptly countersued. Fantasy executive Saul Zaentz became president in 1967, eventually buying the company from original owners Max and Soul Weiss in December of that year. The sale of Fantasy Records to Zaentz resulted in both Guaraldi and the label dismissing the twin lawsuits, leaving Guaraldi a free agent. Thirty-five years after Guaraldi's death, Fantasy Records and its parent company Concord Music were sued by Guaraldi's children for engaging in "a system" of "serving false and deceptive statements while underreporting units sold and underpaying royalties." Their lawsuit, filed in December 2011, claimed a private accountant uncovered a discrepancy of at least $2 million for the years 2005–2010 alone. When asked if the alleged wrongdoing goes back decades further, the Guaraldi family's attorney Alan Neigher responded, "Well, we hope it does."

During the period of flux with Fantasy in 1967, Guaraldi formed his own record label, D & D (named after his children, David and Dia), and released his only album on the label in December 1967, Vince Guaraldi with the San Francisco Boys Chorus.

Compositions for Charles Schulz's Peanuts

A Boy Named Charlie Brown and A Charlie Brown Christmas
In 1963, while searching for music to accompany a planned Peanuts documentary entitled A Boy Named Charlie Brown, television producer Lee Mendelson heard "Cast Your Fate to the Wind" on the radio while driving across the Golden Gate Bridge. Mendelson then contacted Ralph J. Gleason, who put him in touch with Guaraldi. Mendelson offered Guaraldi the job of composing the score for the documentary, which Guaraldi gladly accepted. Within several weeks, Mendelson received a call from an excited Guaraldi who wanted to play a piece of music he had just written. Mendelson, not wanting his first exposure to the new music to be marred by the poor audio qualities of a telephone, suggested coming over to Guaraldi's studio. Guaraldi enthusiastically refused, saying "I’ve got to play this for someone right now or I’ll explode!" He then began playing the yet-untitled "Linus and Lucy" for Mendelson, who agreed the song was perfect for Schulz's Peanuts characters. Reflecting on the song in 2008, Mendelson said, "it just blew me away. It was so right, and so perfect, for Charlie Brown and the other characters. I have no idea why, but I knew that song would affect my entire life. There was a sense, even before it was put to animation, that there was something very, very special about that music."

The documentary soundtrack, entitled Jazz Impressions of A Boy Named Charlie Brown, was recorded by Guaraldi's current trio (with bassist Monty Budwig and drummer Colin Bailey) in October 1964 and released in December of that year. Although the documentary was ultimately shelved due to Mendelson's inability to secure sponsorship, Schulz and Mendelson retained Guaraldi for the upcoming Peanuts Christmas special, A Charlie Brown Christmas (1965). The soundtrack album was recorded by the Vince Guaraldi Trio, this time featuring drummer Jerry Granelli and bassist Fred Marshall, and contained the songs "Christmas Time Is Here", "Skating" and "Linus and Lucy". Both the seasonal television special and accompanying soundtrack were very successful.

Derrick Bang, Guaraldi historian and author of Vince Guaraldi at the Piano, commented that, "the importance of Jazz Impressions of A Boy Named Charlie Brown and its successor, the score to the Christmas special, cannot be overstated; rarely has an entertainment icon been so quickly—and firmly—welded to a musical composition...indeed, to an entire body of work from one individual. Guaraldi defined the Peanuts sound, and it's just as true today as it was in the 1960s. The compositions themselves are uniformly sparkling; it's as if the jazz pianist and his trio were waiting for this precise inspiration." Mendelson concurred: "There's no doubt in my mind, that if we hadn't had that Guaraldi score, we wouldn't have had the franchise we later enjoyed."

It's the Great Pumpkin, Charlie Brown
All involved with A Charlie Brown Christmas initially regarded the stunning success of the project as something of a one-time fluke, but the second official Peanuts television special—Charlie Brown's All Stars!—was televised in June 1966 to similarly high ratings and acclaim. It was at this point that Schulz, Mendelson and animator Bill Melendez focused on creating another holiday blockbuster in the vein of A Charlie Brown Christmas, eventually titled It's the Great Pumpkin, Charlie Brown. Guaraldi spent most of summer 1966 composing cues for the Halloween-themed special, strongly encouraging Mendelson to consider making "Linus and Lucy", which had been featured prominently in the Christmas special, the unofficial Peanuts theme. Guaraldi did not include the song in the music score for Charlie Brown's All Stars! and worked to correct that oversight by featuring it throughout It's the Great Pumpkin, Charlie Brown. Melendez responded to Guaraldi's suggestion by beginning the special with a lengthy cold open sequence sans dialogue, employing only music and sound effects to convey Linus and Lucy's search for a pumpkin. Guaraldi recorded a fresh version of "Linus and Lucy" for the opening sequence as a sextet, featuring Budwig and Bailey, as well as trumpeter Emmanuel Klein, guitarist John Gray, and flautist Ronnie Lang. Lang's flute counterpoint was featured throughout the new version of "Linus and Lucy", resulting in the song ultimately becoming the Peanuts franchise signature melody.

Guaraldi went on to compose scores for twelve additional Peanuts animated television specials, as well as the feature film A Boy Named Charlie Brown and the documentary Charlie Brown and Charles Schulz (both 1969). Despite the wealth of Peanuts material Guaraldi recorded, only A Charlie Brown Christmas and A Boy Named Charlie Brown (both the unaired documentary and feature film) received official soundtrack releases during his lifetime.

"I have always felt that one of the key elements that made A Charlie Brown Christmas was the music," said Mendelson in 2010. "It gave it a contemporary sound that appealed to all ages. Although Vince had never scored anything else and although I was basically a documentary film maker at the time, we started to work together on the cues because we both loved jazz and we both played the piano. So he would bring in the material for each scene and we would go over it scene by scene. Most of the time, the music worked perfectly. But there were times we would either not use something or use it somewhere else. We went through this same process on all sixteen shows. Although there was always some left over music, most of the time what he wrote and performed is what went on the air."

Later years
Guaraldi's final three albums released during his lifetime were recorded for Warner Bros.-Seven Arts after spending nearly two years trying to extricate himself from Fantasy Records. Warner signed Guaraldi to a three-record deal in early 1968, insisting that his inaugural release consist of Peanuts material. This was done in part to fill the void left by a lack of soundtrack albums to accompany the successful television specials Charlie Brown's All Stars!, It's the Great Pumpkin, Charlie Brown, You're in Love, Charlie Brown and He's Your Dog, Charlie Brown. Guaraldi responded with new renditions of eight of his most popular scores from those programs on his first release, Oh Good Grief!.

Guaraldi was then given complete artistic control over his second self-produced Warner effort, The Eclectic Vince Guaraldi, resulting in an unfocused and overindulgent album that was not well received by either critics or consumers. At Warner's insistence, arranger Shorty Rogers was recruited to produce Guaraldi's final album, Alma-Ville. Though deemed a focused improvement over the previous album, Warner did not promote the album, ultimately choosing not to retain Guaraldi at the end of their three-record deal. Both The Eclectic Vince Guaraldi and Alma-Ville gradually fell into obscurity, while Oh Good Grief! remained a steady seller due to the perpetual popularity of the Peanuts franchise.

After working on the soundtrack for the Peanuts feature film A Boy Named Charlie Brown (1969), Guaraldi ceased releasing any new material. In his review of The Complete Warner Bros.–Seven Arts Recordings, The Recoup critic Joseph Kyle lamented, "frustrated and unable to secure a record deal, he spent the remainder of his life as a live performer, recording more soundtrack material, and banking on the goodwill his Peanuts compositions earned him." Guaraldi's sound also evolved into a more fusion jazz/rock sound, as he largely traded the piano for Hammond B-3 and Fender Rhodes electric keyboards. His live performances included musicians who specialized in funk and soul as well as traditional jazz. Posthumous releases Oaxaca (recorded 1970–71), Live on the Air (recorded February 1974), and North Beach feature both studio and live performances recorded during this period of transition.

All Peanuts soundtracks scored after Play It Again, Charlie Brown (1971) feature Guaraldi favoring electric keyboards over traditional piano as well. You're a Good Sport, Charlie Brown (1975), Guaraldi's penultimate music score, fused his fusion jazz style with the funk, disco and pop music that was popular at the time coupled with the use of Minimoog and ARP String Ensemble synthesizers.

Guaraldi biographer and historian Derrick Bang put the musician's later years in perspective, saying, "As jazz clubs were closing in the 1960s, with the advent of rock 'n' roll—a development that put many jazz musicians out of work—Guaraldi embraced the enemy, adjusting his style and approach to include electric keyboards. By the mid-'70s, he had become a respected veteran in what remained of the declining Northern California jazz club scene."

The amount of wealth Guaraldi accumulated from his perpetual Peanuts scoring opportunities plus royalties from previous work allowed him to live comfortably in Mill Valley, California. He continued to perform at small, local clubs out of a desire to do so rather than financial necessity. The monumental success garnered from his Peanuts work resulted in lucrative offers coming in from all over the U.S., all of which he declined. "Once the Peanuts music became famous, Vince could have gone out and done a whole lot more," Mendelson said. "But he was very provincial; he loved San Francisco, and he liked hanging out and playing at the local clubs. He never branched out from there; he never really wanted to. He'd get offers, but he'd tell me, 'I just want to do this; I'm having a good time, and I'm satisfied with it'." Eddie Duran concurred, saying, "he did talk at times about moving to Los Angeles, but I think he really dug staying in the area, because he was sure of himself. When you're sure of where you are as an artist, you don't seek to go other places and prove it."

Sudden death and impact
Guaraldi died suddenly on February 6, 1976, at age 47 after suffering a massive heart attack. The evening before, he had dined at Mendelson's home and was reportedly not feeling well, complaining of indigestion-like chest discomfort. "He was about to do his first cruise. He'd be able to play Peanuts music on the ship, and he was excited about that. We talked about the cruise and the Peanuts shows, and I said that I didn't know what the next one would be yet, but that we wouldn't start until he got back. But he also said he wasn't feeling well, and had gone to see the doctor. The doctor thought Vince might have a diaphragmatic hernia, and that they might have to deal with it."

The following morning, on February 6, Guaraldi awoke with a bad cold and remained in bed throughout the day. That afternoon, Guaraldi finished recording the soundtrack for It's Arbor Day, Charlie Brown at Wally Heider Studios in San Francisco with bassist Seward McCain and drummer Jim Zimmerman. "We had just come back from a concert we did up in the mountain," recalled Zimmerman, "and Vince had been skiing, and up there carrying on like nothing was bothering him. But once we were back in the studio, he started complaining that his stomach was bothering him."

That evening, after concluding the first set at Butterfield's Nightclub in Menlo Park, California, with his interpretation of the Beatles' "Eleanor Rigby", Guaraldi and Zimmerman returned to the room in which they were staying that weekend at the adjacent Red Cottage Inn, to relax before the next set. Zimmerman commented, "Vince was feeling sick to his stomach. He got up to go to the bathroom...and went down on the floor. I tried to bring him around but wasn't successful. It happened so fast." McCain commented, "Vince headed for the bathroom but never made it. When Vince fell and hit the floor, Jim [Zimmerman] got me. We went back and tried to revive him, but it didn't work." Zimmerman added, "It is very romantic to think of someone going out just after they play. I wish he hadn't."

Guaraldi was rushed to Stanford Hospital where he was pronounced dead on arrival at 11:07 P.M. The official cause of death was certified as "acute myocardial infarction, due to or as a consequence of coronary arteriosclerosis with thrombosis and generalized arteriosclerosis."

Pianist George DeQuattro recalled years later, "I saw him about a week before he passed away. Vince seemed really fine. But he had seen a doctor because he had stomach problems, and was feeling ill and tired. The doctor told him it might just be ulcers, and prescribed some dumb medicine and told him to forget about it. But it wasn't that, and it's really a shame. That would never happen today." In his 2012 biography, Vince Guaraldi at the Piano, author Derrick Bang wrote, "as time passed, Guaraldi's friends, family and colleagues would begin to wonder if a stomach aneurysm—or something else—had played a role in that heart attack," adding that Guaraldi's "complaint of a painful stomach ache clearly hadn't been taken seriously enough."

Guaraldi's death was a blow to his friends, family and colleagues. "It was totally unexpected," said Mendelson. "The day before the funeral, Carmella [Guaraldi's mother] called and said that they wanted to use the Peanuts music. I said, 'Oh, God, I don't think that's a good idea.' I begged her not to do it, but she was a strong woman. And they did play it, and I just fell apart; everybody broke up. She was sitting right behind me. I guess it was the right thing to do, but that made the funeral very hard. It was not an easy day; he was so young. It was one of the saddest days of my life." Peanuts animator Bill Melendez added, "He was a real good guy and we miss him."

"I was in New York, and Vince Lateano told me," said drummer Mike Clark in 2010. "It was the last thing I could think of, that Guaraldi would die. It blew my mind. I'm still saddened, when I think of him, because he was such an energized person, and he seemed to have an endless supply of good fortune. It seemed everything he touched turned into money or opportunity. I simply couldn't believe it."

Rev. Charles Gompertz, who invited Guaraldi to perform at Grace Cathedral in 1965, commented in 1981, "I think part of Vince's problem was that he never really took very good care of himself. He stayed out late, he smoked, and he did a whole lot of things. He tried everything. I mean, when skateboards first came out, he was the first kid on his block to get one, only as a kid he happened to be about 30. He pushed himself to the limit, whether musically or physically. He saw himself as a very youthful person, but he didn't do any of the physical things you have to do to prepare yourself to live like that." His mother Carmella Guaraldi added, "When it happened down at Butterfield's, when the end finally came, he went the way he would have wanted to go, with the piano."

Guaraldi is buried at Holy Cross Cemetery in Colma, California.

Personal life
Guaraldi married high school girlfriend Shirley Moskowitz on February 1, 1953. She initially filed for divorce on April 21, 1966, citing "extreme cruelty", which was eventually withdrawn. Moskowitz filed a second time in June 1968, which took effect on December 8, 1970. The union produced two children: David Anthony Guaraldi (b. August 11, 1955) and Dia Lisa (b. February 16, 1960). Guaraldi also had a long-term affair with Gretchen Katamay, with whom he appeared on the cover of his 1964 album, The Latin Side of Vince Guaraldi.

Legacy
A book-length biography of Guaraldi was published in March 2012. Vince Guaraldi at the Piano, by author and Guaraldi archivist Derrick Bang, chronicles Guaraldi's career and role in the Northern California jazz scene, and also includes a complete discography and filmography, as well as an appendix of quotations from Guaraldi's former sidemen.

Jazz musician David Benoit has often credited Guaraldi and the Charlie Brown Christmas soundtrack for his interest in jazz. In 1985, Benoit recorded a cover of Guaraldi's "Linus and Lucy" for an album called This Side Up, which enjoyed considerable radio airplay and helped launch the smooth jazz genre. He released "Cast Your Fate to the Wind" on the album Waiting for Spring in 1989.

New Age pianist George Winston released a Guaraldi tribute album in 1996 titled Linus and Lucy: The Music of Vince Guaraldi. Winston performed many Peanuts songs that had not been released by Guaraldi. "I love his melodies and his chord progressions", Winston said of Guaraldi. "He has a really personal way of doing voicings. His music is part of our culture and we know it even if we don’t know Vince. He had three bags: the Latin, the Peanuts, and the impressionistic 'Cast Your Fate to the Wind' stuff. And those three bags are all his." The album was very successful, leading Winston to record a follow-up, titled Love Will Come: The Music of Vince Guaraldi, Volume 2, released in early 2010. A third volume, entitled Count the Ways: The Music of Vince Guaraldi, Volume 3, is slated for a future release.

Mendelson reflected on Guaraldi's contribution to the Peanuts franchise when Winston released his two tribute albums, saying "Several generations have now grown up with Vince Guaraldi's music. If people hear just one or two bass notes of the intro to 'Linus and Lucy', they cheer. The Peanuts programs and Vince's music were such a wonderful marriage. It's a shame it got cut off so soon, but people like George are perpetuating it, for which we are very appreciative."

In 2003, Guaraldi's son David began working to secure the necessary licenses to distribute some of his father's previously unreleased material. The first release, The Charlie Brown Suite & Other Favorites, featured an archived 1969 live performance of the seven-part "Charlie Brown Suite". Other releases include Oaxaca (2004), North Beach (2006), Vince Guaraldi and the Lost Cues from the Charlie Brown Television Specials, Volumes 1 (2007) and 2 (2008), Live on the Air (2008) and An Afternoon with the Vince Guaraldi Quartet (2011).

In 2010, a two-hour documentary entitled The Anatomy of Vince Guaraldi was screened at a variety of jazz and film festivals. The documentary highlighted newly discovered and restored footage of Guaraldi's appearances and recording sessions and featured new performances and insights from Winston, Dave Brubeck, Dick Gregory, Jon Hendricks, Leonard Maltin, Paul Krassner and surviving Guaraldi sidemen Eddie Duran, Dean Reilly, and Jerry Granelli. The documentary was co-produced by Toby Gleason (son of Ralph J. Gleason) and filmmaker Andrew Thomas. The Anatomy of Vince Guaraldi was the recipient of five "Best Documentary" awards, and was a special presentation at the Library of Congress and Monterey Jazz Festival. Gleason commented, "let's just agree that Vince Guaraldi re-invented the sound of the modern American Christmas."

In the original liner notes for Jazz Impressions of A Boy Named Charlie Brown, Ralph J. Gleason praised Guaraldi's Peanuts contributions, noting, "The hardest task an artist faces is not just to achieve self-expression; that almost comes by definition, even if it's difficult to hone that self-expression into something good enough to be art." Gleason continued: "It is another kind of thing altogether to look at, hear, feel and experience somebody else's artistic expression and then make something of your own which shows empathy, which relates to the other but which still has your own individual artistic stamp. That is what Vince Guaraldi achieved with his scores for Charlie Brown. He took his inspiration from the creations of Charles Schulz and made music that reflects that inspiration, is empathetic with the image and is still solidly and unmistakably Vince Guaraldi."

In his review of The Definitive Vince Guaraldi (2009), All About Jazz critic David Rickert credited Guaraldi for introducing many to the world of jazz music "before we even knew what it was. [Guaraldi]'s soundtracks for the Peanuts television specials were a novel idea in cartoon scoring, yet seemed to perfectly fit the deceptively sophisticated adventures of Charlie Brown and the rest of the Peanuts gang. His originals were some of the best jazz to come from the West Coast scene and a tribute to what can happen when a great muse hits a gifted composer."

Band members
Guaraldi used a variety of sidemen throughout his career. His main preference was playing as a trio, although this number would increase depending on the needs of a song, live performance or Peanuts soundtrack. The largest confluence of musicians occurred in 1969 for soundtrack recordings of It Was a Short Summer, Charlie Brown (octet) and A Boy Named Charlie Brown (nonet).

For bass/double bass, regular sidemen during the 1950s and 1960s included Monty Budwig, Dean Reilly, Fred Marshall and Tom Beeson. During the 1970s, Guaraldi performed with Koji Kataoka and primarily Seward McCain.

Guitarist Eddie Duran served steadily throughout the 1950s and 1960s, save for mid-1963–65 when Guaraldi teamed up with guitarist Bola Sete as a double act. During the 1970s, Guaraldi himself performed guitar when necessary but otherwise did not retain a sideman to fill the position.

Guaraldi's first two releases—Vince Guaraldi Trio (1956) and A Flower Is a Lovesome Thing (1957)—did not feature a drummer. Starting in 1961, Colin Bailey filled the role, followed by Jerry Granelli. Mike Clark became Guaraldi's regular drummer for live performances during the 1970s. Other drummers included Lee Charlton, John Rae, Al Coster, Eliot Zigmund, Glenn Cronkhite, Vince Lateano, Mark Rosengarden, and Jim Zimmerman.

The original Vince Guaraldi Trio consisted of Dean Reilly (bass) and Eddie Duran (guitar), appearing on Guaraldi's first two albums. The second lineup, considered the first of two "classic" trios, featured Monty Budwig (bass) and Colin Bailey (drums). This version of the classic trio appeared on Jazz Impressions of Black Orpheus and Jazz Impressions of A Boy Named Charlie Brown. The second of two classic trios featured Fred Marshall (bass) and Jerry Granelli (drums). This incarnation was featured on more albums than any other trio, including Vince Guaraldi, Bola Sete and Friends, Jazz Casual: Paul Winter/Bola Sete and Vince Guaraldi, The Latin Side of Vince Guaraldi, From All Sides and A Charlie Brown Christmas.

Timeline

Discography

As leader/co-leader

Additional sources:

Singles

As sideman
 1953 The Cal Tjader Trio (Guaraldi's first recorded session)
 1956 Introducing Gus Mancuso (Cal Tjader)
 1957 Jazz at the Blackhawk (Cal Tjader Quartet)
 1957 Cal Tjader (Cal Tjader Quartet)
 1957 Conte Candoli Quartet
 1957 Frank Rosolino Quintet
 1957 Jazz Erotica (Richie Kamuca)
 1958 Mas Ritmo Caliente (Cal Tjader)
 1958 Cal Tjader-Stan Getz Sextet (all-star studio session that includes a long/extended version of Guaraldi's piece "Ginza")
 1958 Latin Concert (Cal Tjader Quintet – all-star group with Mongo Santamaría, Willie Bobo and Al McKibbon)
 1959 A Night at the Blackhawk (Cal Tjader Sextet)
 1959 Latin For Lovers (Cal Tjader with Strings)
 1959 Tjader Goes Latin (Cal Tjader)
 1959 Latinsville! (Victor Feldman)
 1960 Little Band Big Jazz (Conte Candoli All Stars)
 1974 Jimmy Witherspoon & Ben Webster — Previously Unissued Recordings (a 1967 session from the Verve Records archive; the "Black Orpheus" incarnation of Guaraldi's trio supports the two leaders recorded live from "The Jazz Workshop" in San Francisco, CA.)
 2008 Live at the Monterey Jazz Festival 1958–1980 (Guaraldi performs on four tracks in 1958 with Cal Tjader's group featuring Santamaria, Bobo, McKibbon, and guest clarinetist Buddy DeFranco at the festival's inaugural year)
 2012 The Cal Tjader Quintet Live at Club Macumba San Francisco 1956 (previously unreleased live performance with the Tjader quintet, featuring between-session audio)

Albums showcasing or featuring Guaraldi

Peanuts soundtrack list

References

External links
 
 Vince Guaraldi on LP and CD (complete discography)
 Vince Guaraldi biography and discography at FiveCentsPlease
 Vince Guaraldi at the Piano by Derrick Bang The definitive musical biography of Vince Guaraldi, published March 2012.
 March 2015 radio interview (KDRT program "Davisville") with David Willat, who as a child sang on A Charlie Brown Christmas and At Grace Cathedral + Guaraldi author Derrick Bang
 

1928 births
1976 deaths
20th-century American composers
20th-century American male musicians
20th-century American pianists
20th-century jazz composers
American jazz composers
American jazz pianists
American male jazz composers
American male pianists
American people of Italian descent
American Roman Catholics
American television composers
Animated film score composers
Animation composers
Burials at Holy Cross Cemetery (Colma, California)
Composers from San Francisco
Cool jazz pianists
Fantasy Records artists
Grammy Award winners
Jazz musicians from San Francisco
Male television composers
Peanuts music
Pianists from San Francisco
San Francisco State University alumni
Songwriters from California
United States Army soldiers
Warner Records artists
West Coast jazz pianists